Jazz, The Personal Dimension is a jazz album recorded by the Toshiko Akiyoshi Quartet in New York City in early February 1971 and released by Victor (Japan) Records (Victor SPX-2).

Track listing 
Side 'A'
"The Village" (Akiyoshi)
"The Sea in Springtime" (Miyagi)
Side 'B'
"Lover Man" (Davis, Ramirez, Sherman)
"State of Being" (Akiyoshi)

Personnel
Toshiko Akiyoshi – piano 
Lew Tabackin – tenor saxophone, flute  
Lyn Christie – bass
Bill Goodwin – drums

Personnel note: Although the promotional poster photographed for the album cover lists Bob Daugherty and Mickey Roker on bass and drums (respectively), the album liner notes credit Lyn Christie and Bill Goodwin.

References
Victor SPX-2
Jazz The Personal Dimension at discogs.org

Toshiko Akiyoshi live albums
1971 live albums
Victor Entertainment live albums